Manolis Kotoulas (born 3 April 1978) is a Greek cyclist. He competed in the men's cross-country mountain biking event at the 2004 Summer Olympics.

References

1978 births
Living people
Greek male cyclists
Olympic cyclists of Greece
Cyclists at the 2004 Summer Olympics
Place of birth missing (living people)